The 2019 Campeonato Baiano de Futebol was the 115th edition of Bahia's top professional football league. The competition began on 19 January and ended on 21 April. Bahia won the championship for the 48th time.

First phase

Semifinals

|}

Finals

Bahia won 2–1 on aggregate.

References

2019 in Brazilian football leagues
Campeonato Baiano